Cusanelli is an Italian surname.

List of people with the surname 

 Christine Cusanelli (born 1972), Canadian politician
 Katelynn Cusanelli, American celebrity

See also 

 Cubanelle
 Cusance

Surnames
Surnames of Italian origin
Italian-language surnames